Petar Krumov is a composer, arranger and conductor born on 6 August 1934 in Stara Zagora, Bulgaria.

He studied choral conducting with Professor Georgi Dimitrov at the Pancho Vladigerov State Academy of Music (Sofia), from which he graduated in 1957. During his studies and as a result of the influence of Filip Kutev he became interested in Bulgarian folk music, which has been his main field of work since then. In 1957 he founded the Dobrudja Folk Ensemble, which he directed until 1982. He became then Director of the folk ensemble "Silistra", until 1988. He has been a member of the jury in many folklore festivals, both International and Bulgarian. He has received several awards, among them the Golden Medal at the National Folklore Competition (1959, 1964, 1969 and 1984). He is holder of the Order of Saint Cyril and Saint Methodius II Rank. Krumov is also author of several books and articles on Bulgarian folklore and music.

References

1934 births
Living people
Musicians from Stara Zagora